Chiara Angelicola (born September 15, 1984) is an American singer-songwriter and musician, known for her work in the musical projects Motel Pools and most notably Bird Call. She lives and works in Los Angeles, CA.

Bird Call explores a range of emotional territory with her voice, vulnerable lyrics, and candid stage presence whilst providing an aural backdrop that is variably experimental, melodically driven, and, most recognizably, somber and heartfelt. Since 2009, Bird Call has lured fans and perked ears while touring and sharing the stage with favorites including Angel Olsen, Kyp Malone, Amen Dunes, Christopher Willits, and others. Bird Call has released the following:

The Animals Know EP (FHC Records, Sept. 2010)
Other Creatures EP (FHC Records, June 2011)
Phantom Limbs - Remix EP (Zap Records, June 2013)
Will We Get to Mars? LP (Found Objects, September 2013)
Every Day Is Exactly the Same -NIN Single (January 2014)
Tao of Love [The-Drum Reboot] (May 2014)
Year of the Dogfish (Papavero Records, Nov 2019)

For 15 years, Chiara Angelicola’s most well-known project Bird Call has garnered fans and loyal ears from indie music critics like Under the Radar, who describe Bird Call as "dangerous and romantic, emoting over a bed of cinema-worthy synths like Grimes on downers."  Because of the artist’s known propensity towards a mercurial presence and sound, she has always evolved, yet remained rooted on a foundation of vulnerable lyrics and a voice that WNYC describes as “direct and impassioned”. Since her 2011 International Songwriting Competition win for “Best Performer”  beside pop artist, Kimbra, Angelicola has gone on to share the stage with artists such as Angel Olsen, Empress Of, Kyp Malone’s Rain Machine, Ice Balloons, Donna Lewis and Reptar. In the last decade, Angelicola has released five EPs and two LPs. Bird Call’s music is licensed for widespread use and heard on several television networks including Hulu, Netflix, Amazon, Fox, and Lifetime.

Bird Call's latest LP, Year of the Dogfish, released Nov 8th 2019 (Papavero Records), is Angelicola's full-length release since her Will We Get to Mars LP (Zap Records, 2013), which was produced by Bryan Senti (Feist, Mark Ronson, Rufus Wainwright), and which The Guardian stamped as “heart-burstingly lovely”. Since then, Chiara additionally released two EP’s with her second project, Motel Pools, Volume I (2015) and Volume II (2016), with the former produced by Kyp Malone of TV on the Radio.

Year of the Dogfish is a collection of songs written by Angelicola between 2016 and 2018, during which Chiara left the Bay Area and moved to Los Angeles. The 405 calls the new record “her most striking music yet”. Year of the Dogfish is Angelicola's representation of the complexities of solitude, isolation, loss, recovery, and, ultimately, transcendence. It is her most honest work to date and produced by the artist herself alongside longtime friend, engineer, and mixer Gabriel Galvin of Four Foot Studios in Brooklyn, NY.

2014 and prior
After having written a collection of new songs in winter 2011, Angelicola approached musician, composer, and orchestrator Bryan Senti (Mark Ronson, Rufus Wainwright, Miike Snow) to produce Bird's first full-length record. Over the course of 12 months, Angelicola and Senti embarked on a musical journey crafting a sonic landscape that encompasses the body of work found in the new record, Will We Get To Mars?, which FACT mag recently dubbed "phantasmagoric".

Phantom Limbs, an EP of remixes including a rendition by Chicago-based producers The-Drum, released June 3, 2013 via the UK's Zap Records, which upon its premiere, WNYC described as "a change that suits Angelicola's direct, impassioned voice well." Bird Call’s track “Phantom Limbs” recently caught the ears of Under The Radar, who described Angelicola's style as being "dangerous, a romantic quality to it, emoting over a bed of cinema-worthy synths like Grimes on downers."

Will We Get To Mars digitally released worldwide on September 3, 2013 alongside a premiere with UK's The Guardian, who dubbed the record "heart-burstingly lovely..." Jessica Yatrofsky has directed the music video for the self-titled track which premiered with Nylon Magazine on October 4, 2013.

2011 and prior
Prior to 2013's releases, Angelicola released two EPs under the moniker Bird Call. The Animals Know EP was written by the artist during her first winter in Brooklyn, recorded at Studio G by producer Joel Hamilton and released October 2010 (FHC Records). Other Creatures EP (May 2011, FHC Records), also produced by Hamilton, is a collection of cover songs, which features the song "Lost Cause" by Beck.

In 2011, Bird Call won first place in the Performance Category of the International Songwriting Competition for her song "Waltz In The Snow".

"The Animals Know" and "Berlin", songs from The Animals Know EP, are featured on the third season of the Lifetime show Dance Moms. Songs from The Animals Know EP have also been featured on the Carson Daily Show.

Motel Pools
Motel Pools is a garage punk rock project formed by California-native musician Chiara Angelicola, known for her previous work in the project Bird Call. Original demos for Motel Pools were tracked in Chiara's Williamsburg living room in 2011 and then stored in the digital dungeons until her relocation back to California. Upon her return to her hometown of San Francisco, Chiara reached out to friend Kyp Malone (TV on the Radio, Rain Machine) in Brooklyn to help produce the project's first EP. Honus Honus of Man Man makes a guest vocal appearance on the track "Lemme Walk Your Dog". Motel Pools covers Butthole Surfers' Human Cannonball.  All tracks were recorded in living rooms and at Heritage Studios in Burbank, CA in June 2014. In 2016, Motel Pools released a full length LP featuring Volume 1 and Volume 2 EPs. Angelicola wrote and produced Volume II, which was recorded at Black Lodge Recording in Bushwick, NY, engineered and mixed by Gabriel Galvin at Four Foot Studios in Brooklyn, NY and mastered by Mark Santangelo at The Mastering Palace in NY, NY.

References

External links
 Waltz in the Snow

1984 births
Living people
People from Mill Valley, California
American women singer-songwriters
Singer-songwriters from California
21st-century American women singers
21st-century American singers